Dead tree may refer to:
 Dead Trees, an album by From First to Last
 Coarse woody debris, fallen dead trees and the remains of large branches on the ground in forests
 Large woody debris, logs, branches, and other wood that falls into streams and rivers
 Snag (ecology), a standing, partly or completely dead tree; also trees, branches, leaves and other pieces of naturally occurring wood found in a sunken form in rivers and streams
Hard copy, the print version of an online document (humorously)

See also 
Dead wood (disambiguation)